Martha Rhodes (born Boston, Massachusetts) is an American poet, teacher, and publisher.

Biography
Martha Rhodes was born in Boston, Massachusetts. She received her B.A. from The New School for Social Research and her M.F.A. from the Warren Wilson College MFA Program for Writers. She has taught at The New School University, Emerson College, and at the University of California, Irvine's MFA Program. She teaches at the Warren Wilson College MFA Program for Writers A founding editor of Four Way Books, she serves as Publisher and Executive Editor for the award-winning literary press.   She has been interviewed in The New York Times, Los Angeles Review of Books, American Book Review, and The Best American Poetry Blog.

She is author of five poetry collections, most recently The Thin Wall (University of Pittsburgh Press, 2017), "The Beds" (Autumn House Press, 2012), Mother Quiet (Zoo Press, 2004. Her second collection, Perfect Disappearance, won the 2000 Green Rose Prize from New Issues Press). At the Gate was released in 1995 from Provincetown Arts Press. Her books have been reviewed in The Washington Post, Publishers Weekly, Rain Taxi, Kenyon Review, and other venues.

She has published poems in many literary journals including AGNI, Fence, Harvard Review, New England Review, Ploughshares, The American Poetry Review,  Barrow Street, and TriQuarterly, and in anthologies including The Extraordinary Tide: New Poetry by American Women (Columbia University Press, 2001), and The KGB Bar Book of Poems (Harper Collins, 2000), and The New American Poets: A Bread Loaf Anthology (Bread Loaf Writer's Conference/Middlebury College, 2000).

Published works
  The Thin Wall (University of Pittsburgh Press, 2017)
  The Beds (Autumn House Press 2012)
 Mother Quiet (Zoo Press, 2004)
 Perfect Disappearance (New Issues Press, 2000)
 At the Gate (Provincetown Arts, 1999)

References

Sources
 Pine Manor College > 2009 Solstice Conference Faculty
 Sarah Lawrence College > Undergraduate Faculty

External links
 Poem: Agni Online > Hose by Martha Rhodes
 Poem: Virginia Quarterly Review > Issue > Autumn 1992 > pp.703-704 > Poetry > Sweeping the Floor by Martha Rhodes
 Poems: Reading Between A and B > Four Poems by Martha Rhodes
 Martha Rhodes Website
 New Issues Press > Author Page > Martha Rhodes

Poets from New York (state)
Living people
New York University alumni
University of California, Irvine faculty
Sarah Lawrence College faculty
American publishers (people)
American book editors
Warren Wilson College alumni
American women poets
Year of birth missing (living people)
American women academics
21st-century American women